John Rodney is an actor.

John Rodney may also refer to:

Sir John Rodney (MP) (died 1400), MP for Somerset 1391
John Rodney (died 1612), MP for Great Bedwyn 1604–11
John Rodney (of Armsworth) (1765–1847), MP for Launceston 1790–96, Colonial Secretary of Ceylon 1806-33

See also